The Dammastock  (3,630 m) is the highest mountain in the Urner Alps in Switzerland and is part of the Winterberg massif. Its summit ridge forms the border between the cantons of Uri and the Valais. It is the highest summit in the canton of Uri. The tripoint between the cantons of Berne, Valais and Uri lies near the Eggstock, north of the Dammastock. Politically, the Dammastock is split between the municipalities of Göschenen (Uri) and Obergoms (Valais).

The massif is almost completely covered by ice, the large Rhone Glacier on the west side, the smaller Damma Glacier on the east side and the Trift Glacier further on the north side.

It was first climbed by Albert Hoffmann-Burkhardt with guides Johann Fischer and Andreas von Weissenfluh on 28 July 1864.

Huts
Dammastock Hut (2,445 m)
Hotel Tiefenbach (2,109 m)

See also
List of mountains of Uri
List of mountains of Switzerland
List of most isolated mountains of Switzerland

References

External links
The Dammastock on SummitPost

Mountains of the Alps
Alpine three-thousanders
Mountains of the canton of Uri
Mountains of Valais
Highest points of Swiss cantons
Uri–Valais border
Mountains of Switzerland